The Mountain, also known as Forgotten Soldiers, is a 2012 Turkish drama film directed by Alper Çağlar.

The film tells a fictional story in which a duty team sent from a troop to repair a field antenna suddenly falls into an ambush. One short and one long term soldier, the only ones to survive, finally put an end to the war between themselves and join hands for the struggle against the real enemy. Carrying only two rifles, four magazines, a broken antenna and their survival instincts. The mountain is a heroic tale of two young soldiers who discover brotherhood and fortitude.

Plot 
Oğuz from Istanbul, despite having a legal right and money to pay for a shorter period of military service, he chooses to do it for a longer time no matter what rest of the people around him imposes to do.  One week before he is discharged, he finds himself in such a danger to test his courage.

Bekir, who wrangles constantly with Oğuz, has been a long term soldier. He gets on well with neither his commanders, nor his term friends. He has two additional years to be discharged because of his rebellious actions.  However Bekir has pure and unconcerned courage; to be side by side and shoulder by shoulder with Oğuz against the ambush  will be a hard test even for him. 
Having put aside their past animosity just before the raid, they will force limits of bravery in the hardest conditions, and fight together against terrorism, performing exploit in an isolated, freezing and wild area.

Cast 
 Çağlar Ertuğrul - Oğuz
 Ufuk Bayraktar - Bekir
 Fırat Doğruloğlu - Lieutenant Yaşar Demir 
 Mesut Akusta - Staff Sergeant Kemal Karadağ
 Cengiz Coşkun - First Lieutenant Tuğrul Tümen
 Gözde Mutluer - Pelin 
 İpek Bağrıaçık - Defne
 Ali Aksöz - Selçuk
 Özgürcan Çevik - Sülo

Production 
A small team made the film working in difficult conditions, with temperatures as low as -15 °C and snow covered meters high, facing snowstorms in one of the peaks of Palandöken and Konaklı, Erzurum. Shooting began in March.

Sequel
A sequel, The Mountain 2, was released in 2016.

See also 
 2012 in film
 Turkish films of 2012

References

External links 
 
 

2012 films
2012 war drama films
Turkish action war films
2010s Turkish-language films
Films set in Turkey
2012 drama films
2010s action war films
Turkish war drama films